2nd Mechanised Corps may refer to:
 2nd Mechanised Corps (Poland)
 2nd Mechanised Corps (Soviet Union)